Midlands 4 East (South) is a level 9 English Rugby Union league and level 4 of the Midlands League, made up of teams from the southern part of the East Midlands region including clubs from Bedfordshire, Leicestershire, Northamptonshire, Lincolnshire and occasionally Cambridgeshire, all of whom play home and away matches throughout the season.  Each year some of the clubs in this division also take part in the RFU Junior Vase - a level 9-12 national competition.

Formed for the 2006-07 season, the division was originally known as Midlands 5 East (South) but changed to its present name for the 2008-09 season due to league restructuring. Promoted teams tend to move up to Midlands 3 East (South) and since Midlands 5 East (South) was abolished there has been no relegation.

2021-22

Participating teams & locations

Kempston, who finished 11th in 2019-20, and Wellingborough Old Grammarians, who finished 12th in 2019-20, did not return for the current season.

Joining the league are South Leicester who withdrew from Midlands Premier in season 2019-20.

2020–21
Due to the COVID-19 pandemic, the 2020–21 season was cancelled.

2019–20

Participating teams & locations

2018–19

Participating teams & locations

2017–18

Participating teams & locations

Teams 2016-17
Bedford Queens
Bedford Swifts
Bourne
Brackley
Deepings
Old Newtonians
Sileby Town
Stamford College Old Boys
Thorney
Wellingborough Old Grammarians

Teams 2015-16
Bedford Queens (relegated from Midlands 3 East (South))
Bedford Swifts
Birstall
Bourne
Brackley
Deepings
Northampton Men's Own  (relegated from Midlands 3 East (South))
Sileby Town
Stamford College Old Boys
Thorney
Wellingborough Old Grammarians

Teams 2014-15
Bedford Swifts
Bourne	
Brackley (relegated from Midlands 3 East (South))
Corby	
Deepings (relegated from Midlands 3 East (South))
Kempston
Old Newtonians
Sileby Town	
St Neots
Stamford College Old Boys
Thorney
Westwood

Teams 2013-14
Aylestone Athletic
Bedford Swifts
Bourne	
Corby
Kempston
Long Buckby (relegated from Midlands 3 East (South))
Old Newtonians (relegated from Midlands 3 East (South))
Oundle
St Neots
Stamford College Old Boys
Thorney
Westwood

Teams 2012–13
Aylestone Athletic
Bedford Swifts
Bourne
Brackley
Corby
Oundle
St Ives (Midlands)
St Neots
Stamford College Old Boys
Thorney
Wellingborough Old Grammarians
Westwood

Teams 2008–09
Ashfield
Bedford Swifts
Brackley
Bugbrooke 
Daventry  
Deepings 
Long Buckby  
Market Harborough
Northampton Casuals
Northampton Men's Own
Peterborough Lions
Rugby St Andrews
Vauxhall Motors

Original teams

When this division was introduced in 2006 as Midlands 5 East (South), it contained the following teams:

Aylestone St James - promoted from East Midlands/South Leicestershire 2 (champions)
Bedford Queens - transferred from East Midlands/South Leicestershire 1 (4th)
Bedford Swifts - transferred from East Midlands/South Leicestershire 1 (3rd)
Kempston - promoted from East Midlands/South Leicestershire 2 (runners up)
Market Harborough - transferred from East Midlands/South Leicestershire 1 (5th)
Oundle - transferred from East Midlands/South Leicestershire 1 (7th)
St Ives (Midlands) - transferred from East Midlands/South Leicestershire 1 (8th)
Stamford - transferred from Notts, Lincs & Derbyshire/North Leicestershire (11th)
Stoneygate - relegated from Midlands 4 East (South) (10th)
Wellingborough Old Grammarians - transferred from East Midlands/South Leicestershire 1 (6th)

Midlands 4 East (South) honours

Midlands 5 West (North) (2006–2009)

League restructuring ahead of the 2006–07 season saw the introduction of Midlands 5 East (South) and its counterpart Midlands 5 East (North) at tier 9 to replace the discontinued East Midlands/South Leicestershire 1 and Notts, Lincs, Derbyshire/North Leicestershire leagues.  Promotion was to Midlands 4 East (South) and relegation to Midlands 6 East (South).

Midlands 4 East (South) (2009–present)

Further league restructuring by the RFU meant that Midlands 5 East (North) and Midlands 5 East (South) were renamed as Midlands 4 East (North) and Midlands 4 East (South), with both leagues remaining at tier 9.  Promotion was now to Midlands 3 East (South) (formerly Midlands 4 East (South)) and relegation to Midlands 5 East (South) (formerly Midlands 6 East (South)) until that league was discontinued at the end of the 2009–10 season.

Number of league titles

St Neots (2)
Bedford Swifts (1)
Birstall (1)
Brackley (1)
Long Buckby (1)
Market Harborough (1)
N'hampton BBOB (1)
Northampton Men's Own (1)
Oadby Wyggestonians (1)
Old Newtonians (1)
Sileby Town (1)
Stamford (1)
Stockwood Park (1)

Notes

See also
Midlands RFU
East Midlands RFU
Leicestershire RU
English rugby union system
Rugby union in England

References

Rugby First: To view previous seasons in the league, search for any club within that league then click on to club details followed by fixtures and then select the appropriate season.

9
5
Rugby union in Bedfordshire
Rugby union in Northamptonshire
Rugby union in Leicestershire